Elections to Eastleigh Council were held on 10 June 2004.  One third of the council was up for election and the Liberal Democrat party kept overall control of the council.  Overall turnout was 41.4%

After the election, the composition of the council was
Liberal Democrat 32
Conservative 9
Labour 3

Election result

Ward results

External links
 BBC report of 2004 Eastleigh election result

2004
2004 English local elections
2000s in Hampshire